Funny Face is an 2020 American drama film, written and directed by Tim Sutton. It stars Cosmo Jarvis, Dela Meskienyar, Jonny Lee Miller, Dan Hedaya and Rhea Perlman.

The film had its world premiere at the Berlin International Film Festival on February 23, 2020. It was released on March 30, 2021, by Gravitas Ventures.

Plot
The destruction of a young man's grandparents' home leads him to take revenge under a masked persona.

Cast
 Cosmo Jarvis as Saul
 Dela Meskienyar as Zama
 Jonny Lee Miller as Developer
 Dan Hedaya as Benj
 Rhea Perlman as Fernie
 Victor Garber as Developer's Father
 Jeremy Bobb as American Suit
 Ramsey Faragallah
 Heather Raffo

Release
The film had its world premiere at the Berlin International Film Festival on February 23, 2020. It was released on March 30, 2021, by Gravitas Ventures.

Reception

Funny Face received positive reviews from film critics. On Metacritic, the film holds a rating of 61 out of 100, based on 9 critics, indicating "generally favorable reviews".

References

External links
 
 
 

2020 films
American drama films
2020 drama films
2020s English-language films
2020s American films